Kyung-gu is a Korean male given name. The meaning differs based on the hanja with which the name is written. There are 54 hanja with the reading "kyung" and 56 hanja with the reading "gu" on the South Korean government's official list of hanja which may be used in given names.

People with this name include:
Ri Kyong-ku, one of the unconverted long-term prisoners of South Korea
Sol Kyung-gu (born 1968), South Korean actor

See also
List of Korean given names

References

Korean masculine given names